Operation Secure Tomorrow is an operation that took place from February 2004 to July 2004 in Haiti. After a government collapse in Haiti and the resignation of President Jean Bertrand Aristide, the United States invaded Haiti to police the country and stabilize Haiti A multinational force composed of the United States, Chile, Canada, and France was deployed in accordance with UN Resolution 1529.

The force was led by Marine Air Ground Task Force (MAGTF)-8 Commander Colonel Mark Gurganus as well as Brigadier General Ronald S. Coleman and Colonel David H. Berger from the 3rd Battalion 8th Marines. General Berger later became Commandant of the Marine Corps.

The initial contingent of US Marines arrived in Port-au-Prince in the evening of 29 February 2004. By 5 March 2004 a total of 500 French troops, 160 Chileans, 100 Canadians and assorted other nationals deployed to Haiti. On March 22, 2004 the US Department of Defense named the multinational operation in Haiti "Operation Secure Tomorrow". By March 22, the U.S.-led multinational interim force had about 3,300 personnel from the United States, France, Chile and Canada.

See also
 2004 Haitian coup d'état
 United Nations Stabilization Mission in Haiti

External links
 Operation Secure Tomorrow by globalsecurity.org
 U.S. Intervention in Haiti (March 2004)
Haiti
United Nations operations in the Caribbean
History of Haiti
2004 in Haiti
conflicts in 2004
Haiti and the United Nations
Military operations involving the United States
Invasions of Haiti